Aspidosperma cylindrocarpon  is a timber tree native to Brazil, Paraguay, Bolivia, and Peru. It is common in Atlantic Forest, Cerrado and Pantanal vegetation of Brazil.  This plant is cited in Flora Brasiliensis by Carl Friedrich Philipp von Martius. In addition, it is useful for beekeeping.

References

External links
 Flora Brasiliensis: Aspidosperma cylindrocarpon 
 Aspidosperma cylindrocarpon photos
 Aspidosperma cylindrocarpon

cylindrocarpon
Trees of South America
Trees of Brazil
Trees of Paraguay
Trees of Bolivia
Trees of Peru
Flora of the Cerrado
Flora of the Atlantic Forest
Plants described in 1860